Beaton Park Stadium is an Australian basketball centre in Gwynneville, New South Wales. It was the home of National Basketball League side Illawarra Hawks between 1979 and 1998, and is the home to local basketball in Wollongong. It was nicknamed "The Snake Pit" during its time with the Illawarra/Wollongong Hawks.

History 
After the stadiums construction in 1965, a game between Illawarra and the Sydney Paratels opened the stadium.

In 1979 the stadium was used as the Illawarra Hawks home stadium during the inaugural season of the National Basketball League. The Hawks remained at the venue until the opening of the 6,000 seat Wollongong Entertainment Centre in 1998, though they continue to train at the stadium and use it for pre-season games.

The stadium has in the past hosted multiple Australia Boomers and Opals exhibition games in the past, as well as the Harlem Globetrotters, the United States women's national basketball team and multiple NCAA college teams.

References 

Illawarra Hawks
Defunct National Basketball League (Australia) venues
Basketball venues in Australia
Sports venues in New South Wales